John A. Pérez (born September 28, 1969) is an American union organizer and politician. He has been a Regent of the University of California since November 17, 2014, previously serving as the 68th Speaker of the California State Assembly from March 1, 2010, to May 12, 2014. A member of the Democratic Party, he represented the 46th district (2008–2012) and 53rd district (2012–2014) in the California State Assembly.

On October 9, 2013, Pérez announced his candidacy for California State Controller. Pérez finished third in the election, trailing Betty Yee by 481 votes. After initially calling for a recount in 15 California counties, Pérez ultimately conceded to Yee more than a month after the election. In late 2014, he was appointed by Governor Jerry Brown as a Regent of the University of California; in May 2019, the regents elected him as chairman.

Early life and career
Pérez grew up in El Sereno and Highland Park before attending the University of California, Berkeley. At Berkeley he was a member of the CalServe political party. He did not graduate from Berkeley but dropped out after his junior year citing family medical reasons in mid-1990. Early biographies of Pérez dating back to the 1990s called him a Berkeley graduate, a misstatement that was repeated in several press releases issued by Los Angeles mayors and in 2004 remarks inserted by Congresswoman Hilda Solis into the Congressional Record. When the San Francisco Chronicle wrote about these inconsistencies in May 2011, Pérez's office verified that he was not a Berkeley graduate.

Pérez is the cousin of Los Angeles mayor Antonio Villaraigosa and has spent seven years handling political matters for the United Food and Commercial Workers, a union representing supermarket workers. He has also served as political director of the California Labor Federation. He was a member of the board of the Los Angeles Community Redevelopment Agency until 2008, when he resigned to run for the Assembly.

Election to the Assembly and rise to the speakership

Background in politics
Long active in the labor movement, Pérez is a member of the Democratic National Committee, which named him a superdelegate to the 2008 Democratic National Convention in Denver. He endorsed Barack Obama on June 3, 2008, the day of the final primaries in the Democratic presidential nominating calendar.

Election to the Assembly
The 46th district includes the Los Angeles neighborhoods of Boyle Heights, Little Tokyo, Westlake, Vernon and part of South Los Angeles. Pérez succeeded Fabian Núñez, the former Assembly speaker who was forced out by term limits as the district's assemblyman. Pérez faced only a little-known primary challenger in the race to succeed Núñez, winning convincingly. In the general election held on November 4, 2008, he won 85% of the vote.

In 2010, he ran uncontested and received 100% of the vote. In the 2012 election Pérez won the Assembly's 53rd district with 82.8% of the vote.

In 2011, after constitutionally mandated redistricting by the California Citizens Redistricting Commission  most of the areas belonging to the 46th district became the 53rd.

Election as Speaker
Pérez had planned to run for the California Senate in 2010 with Kevin de León slated to be elected speaker. An agreement had apparently been reached by Los Angeles power brokers that would have seen Pérez support de León for speaker while Pérez would run unopposed in the 22nd senate district, the seat being vacated by term-limited Gil Cedillo. Cedillo, in turn, would seek Pérez's seat in the Assembly.

The deal appears to have been derailed by opposition among certain Assembly Democrats to de León becoming Speaker and by a desire to elect a Speaker who could serve longer than two years.  (De León, unlike Pérez, could not serve beyond 2012.) The leadership battle came to a head on December 3, 2009, when Assembly Speaker Karen Bass announced that Pérez had enough support to succeed her. On December 10, the Assembly Democratic caucus met to select the next speaker. During the meeting, de León threw his support to Pérez, who was elected unopposed. He was formally elected by a 48–26 vote of the full Assembly on January 7, 2010, and replaced Bass on March 1, 2010.

Speaker of the California Assembly
Pérez took office as California's 68th Speaker March 1, 2010 and was subsequently reelected in 2010 and 2012, making him one of the longest serving Speakers in the era of term limits.

Major initiatives

Middle Class Scholarship Act
Pérez introduced Assembly Bill 1500 and 1501 in January 2012, together known as the Middle Class Scholarship Act. These bills were double-joined and were crafted to lower the cost of tuition at state colleges and universities for middle-class families by up to 2/3. It also would have provided up to $150 million to California community colleges. As tax measures they were required to achieve a 2/3 supermajority in order to pass as the California Constitution requires due to Proposition 13. AB 1500 and 1501 passed in the Assembly with 54 votes in favor and 25 votes against with 1 not voting; in the Senate the bills failed to pass, receiving 15 votes in favor and 22 votes against with 3 not voting.
Pérez pledged to introduce another measure directed at college affordability during the 2013–2014 legislative sessions.

Governor's Office of Business Development (GoBiz)
In December 2010 Pérez introduced AB 29 to create the Governor's Office of Economic Development (GoBiz) establishing a centralized location for all business resources. AB 29 eased access to the multitude of programs designed to assist businesses looking to move or incorporate in California. AB 29 passed the Assembly with 72 votes in favor and 6 votes against with 2 not voting; in the Senate the bills passed with 31 votes in favor and 3 votes against with 6 not voting.
GoBiz is planning to open satellite offices in China and Mexico as a key function of their mission of attracting investment and businesses to California.

Disincorporation of Vernon, CA
Vernon is an industrial city located in the County of Los Angeles that is home to fewer than 150 residents but acts as a business hub with more than 50,000 employees. Vernon has had a long history of corrupt public officials, official corruption, and voter intimidation. In December 2010, Perez introduced AB 46 to dis-incorporate the city and make it part of unincorporated Los Angeles County. There was broad support from the surrounding communities which have been plagued by the pollution and ill-effects of Vernon's businesses but resistance met with from organized labor. After passing the assembly with 62 votes in favor, 7 votes against, and 10 not voting, the bill was defeated in the Senate with 13 votes in favor, 17 votes against, and 10 not voting.
Following the bill's defeat, Vernon has continued to have serious issues with their elections and public officials, including allegation of voter fraud and disenfranchisement. Additionally, the local power authority, cited frequently as a reason to keep Vernon as an independent, business-focused city, announced significant rate increases. Audits also determined that the city was millions in debt, causing some businesses to announce they were considering moving elsewhere.

Healthcare exchange (Covered California)
Following the passage of President Obama's Patient Protection and Affordable Care Act, Pérez introduced AB 1602 in January 2010 which created the California Health Benefit Exchange, the first such state based program in the nation created to assist with implementation of the Affordable Care Act. This gives individuals and small businesses access to a broad range of insurance products and cost saving options. AB 1602 passed in the Assembly with 51 votes in favor and 27 votes against with 0 not voting; in the Senate the bills passed with 21 votes in favor and 13 votes against with 5 not voting. States across the nation have used AB 1602 as a model for their own programs.

In January 2013 Governor Jerry Brown called a special legislative session to address California health care costs and solutions. During this session, Pérez introduced AB1X1. This bill is designed to allow implementation of the health care coverage expansion envisioned in President Obama's Affordable Care Act. AB1X1 makes Medi-Cal available to 1,000,000 Californians who earn at or below 120 percent of the federal poverty limit.

Farmers Field
In 2011 Pérez was instrumental in the passage of SB-292, which would have sped up construction of the proposed Farmers Field project in Los Angeles. Farmers Field was ultimately never built but the bill he passed later served as the basis of a statewide law that speeds approval of major construction projects without compromising the environmental standards Californians value.

California State Budget
In the first year Pérez served as an Assemblymember, the state faced a budget deficit totaling 64 billion dollars out of a total $110 billion. In his time as Speaker, California's structural deficit has been eliminated, resulting in an estimated 1 billion dollar reserve for the 2013/14 fiscal year and the first across-the-board increase in the state's credit rating since November 2004.

In 2010, he successfully blocked former Governor Schwarzenegger's final budget proposal, which would have wiped out 430,000 jobs for police officers, firefighters, teachers, nurses, and their support personnel. His California Jobs Budget¸ which balanced the budget and created a ten billion dollar private sector job creation fund, forced Gov. Schwarzenegger to back down and agree to a compromise which protected virtually every job eliminated by the initial proposal.

California's budget was frequently passed after the constitutionally-mandated deadline, as the Legislature and Governors negotiated to close multibillion-dollar deficits under the requirement that budget votes have a two-thirds majority to pass. With the 2010 voter approval of Proposition 25, which lowered the threshold necessary to approve a budget to a simple majority, the Legislature adopted two consecutive, balanced and on-time budgets.

Management of the Assembly
The Speaker is charged with the overall management and supervision of the Assembly. She or he appoints members to all committees and subcommittees of the Assembly, allocates funds, staffing, and other resources for the effective operation of the House, and establishes committee schedules.

Operating budget
Under Pérez's leadership, the California Assembly has made a practice of redirecting savings from cutting their operating costs to save fund other state programs.  Between 2010 and 2012, millions were transferred from Assembly operating accounts to save or supplement programs benefitting veterans, families and women.

California Commission on the Status of Women — The Commission on the Status of Women is a non-partisan agency which acts as a public policy body for proposals to address women's issues in the public domain. In April 2012, Pérez transferred money from the Assembly operating budget to the commission to ensure it will continue its vital mission. Along with the transfer of money, the Speaker was able to announce that Academy Award-Winning actor Geena Davis would serve as Chair of the commission.
California National Guard Work for Warriors program — In April 2012, Pérez announced that the Assembly would contribute $500,000 to establish the National Guard "Work for Warriors" Program.  This program places National Guard members with jobs, striving to reduce the unemployment rate in California while ensuring that California's veterans have access to jobs, healthcare, and support service they deserve. Additionally, The Speaker also provided two $300,000 grants to the California Military Department for mental health services which provides resources to better support their members. For his work for Veterans and Military personnel, he was named the California Assembly Legislator of the Year by the Vietnam Veterans of America and was honored with the National Guard Associations of the United States' Charles Dick Medal of Merit Award.
Restoration of Stage III Child Care — In the 2010 budget Governor Schwarzenegger line item vetoed child care which provided subsidized child care for over 81,000 children in 60,0000 working families. In response, Pérez authorized that $6 million from the Assembly operating budget be shifted to provide bridge funding for those child care programs.

Bipartisan Committee Chair Appointments
In each of his terms as Speaker, Pérez has appointed Assemblymembers from the minority Republican Party to chair committees. Then-Assemblymember Col. Paul Cook (R-Yucca Valley) served as Chair of the Committee on Veterans Affairs, before being elected to the United States House of Representatives. The Committee on Local Government was chaired by Assemblymember Cameron Smyth (R-Santa Clarita), who termed-out of office in 2012, and is now chaired by Assemblymember Katcho Achadjian (R-Arroyo Grande).

International Relations
According to the Center for Continuing Study of the California Economy, if California's GDP were compared to those of leading nations, it would rank as the ninth largest economy in the world.  Pérez has led bipartisan delegations of Assembly members on official visits to some of California's most important trading partners, including Mexico, the Republic of Korea, and the State of Israel. Those visits have been reciprocated by a number of foreign leaders, including Israeli President Shimon Peres, and a delegation of federal Senators from Mexico.

Pérez has also met with officials from Australia, Chile, and Afghanistan to help strengthen ties with those nations, greeted the Duke and Duchess of Cambridge on their trip to California, and worked closely with the California Travel & Tourism Commission to promote foreign tourism in California, traveling to London with Commission Members to launch the Dreamland Campaign.

Post-Assembly career
After the election, in late 2014, California Governor Jerry Brown appointed Pérez as a Regent of the University of California.

However, on December 10 he announced his withdrawal from that race, saying that he had received a recent medical diagnosis that he said would prevent him from engaging fully in a campaign.

Personal life
Pérez is openly gay and the first openly LGBT Speaker of the California State Assembly. After Minnesota's Allan Spear, he is the second LGBT person elected to lead a state legislative chamber. His election as speaker preceded the February 2010 election of Gordon D. Fox, an openly gay Democrat, to be speaker of the Rhode Island House of Representatives, though Fox took office immediately and Pérez did not take office until March 1.  Pérez was the 2nd openly gay person appointed to the University of California Board of Regents.  The first was Sheldon Andelson, board member of the Los Angeles Gay and Lesbian Community Services Center, who was appointed in 1980, also by then-Governor Jerry Brown.

The Gay & Lesbian Victory Fund endorsed Pérez for election.  He was a member of the California Legislative LGBT Caucus.

References

External links

 Campaign website
 Join California John A. Perez

|-

|-

1969 births
21st-century American politicians
Candidates in the 2014 United States elections
Candidates in the 2016 United States elections
Gay politicians
LGBT state legislators in California
LGBT Hispanic and Latino American people
Hispanic and Latino American state legislators in California
Living people
Politicians from Los Angeles
Speakers of the California State Assembly
Democratic Party members of the California State Assembly
Trade unionists from California
University of California, Berkeley alumni
United Food and Commercial Workers people